Iveta Matoušková (born 5 January 1987) is a Czech handballer player for Start Elbląg and the Czech national team.

References

1987 births
Living people
Czech female handball players